Corrie or Corry is a given name, often a diminutive, short form of Cornelia or Cornelius.

Feminine
Corrie Bakker (born 1945), Dutch sprinter ("Cornelia")
Corrie ten Boom (1892–1983), Dutch Holocaust survivor who helped many Jews escape ("Cornelia")
Corry Brokken (1932–2016), Dutch singer ("Cornelia")
Corrie de Bruin (born 1976), Dutch discus thrower and shot putter
Corrie Cameron (1904–1993), New Zealand printmaker and watercolorist
Corrie Clark (born 1982), American swimmer
Corrie Corfield (born 1961), English newsreader for BBC Radio 4 ("Coriona")
Corrie Hartong (1906–1991), Dutch dancer, dance teacher and choreographer ("Cornelia")
Corrie Hermann (born 1932), Dutch GreenLeft politician ("Cornelia")
Corrie Laddé (1915–1996), Dutch swimmer ("Cornelia")
Corrie Lothrop (born 1992), American gymnast 
Corrie Moreau (born c.1978), American evolutionary biologist and entomologist
Corrie Schimmel (born 1939), Dutch swimmer ("Cornelia")
Corrie Scott (born 1993), Scottish swimmer
Corrie Stein (born 1940), Dutch-born politician in New Jersey
Corry Vreeken (born 1928), Dutch chess master ("Cornelia")
Corrie Winkel (born 1944), Dutch swimmer ("Kornelia")
Corry van Zanten (1855–1946), Dutch opera singer, singing teacher and author ("Cornélie")

Masculine
Corrie Artman (1907–1970), American football player ("Corwin")
Corrie Brown (1949–2007), British bobsledder
Corrie D'Alessio (born 1969), Canadian ice hockey goaltender
Corrie Denison, pseudonym of Eric Partridge (1894–1979), New Zealand–British writer and lexicographer
Corrie Dick (born 1990), British musician 
Corrie Erickson (born 1981), American painter, graphic designer, and tattoo artist
Corry Evans (born 1990), Northern Irish footballer
Corrie Gardner (1879–1960), Australian long-jumper, hurdler and Australian rules football player ("Corris")
Corrie Grant (1850–1924), British journalist, barrister and Liberal Party politician
Corrie McKeague (born 1993), British RAF gunner who disappeared in 2016
Corrie Sanders (1966–2012), South African boxer ("Cornelius")
Corrie van Zyl (born 1961), South African cricketer ("Cornelius")

See also
Corie, given name
Cory, given and last name
Corey, given and last name
Cor (given name)

Dutch feminine given names
English unisex given names
Hypocorisms